John Tracy Kidder (born November 12, 1945) is an American writer of nonfiction books. He received the   Pulitzer Prize for his The Soul of a New Machine (1981), about the creation of a new computer at Data General Corporation. He has received praise and awards for other works, including his biography of Paul Farmer, a physician and anthropologist, titled Mountains Beyond Mountains (2003).

Kidder is considered a literary journalist because of the strong story line and personal voice in his writing. He has cited as his writing influences John McPhee, A. J. Liebling, and George Orwell. In a 1984 interview he said, "McPhee has been my model. He's the most elegant of all the journalists writing today, I think."

Kidder wrote in a 1994 essay, "In fiction, believability may have nothing to do with reality or even plausibility. It has everything to do with those things in nonfiction. I think that the nonfiction writer's fundamental job is to make what is true believable."

Early life and education
John Tracy Kidder was born November 12, 1945, in New York City.
He graduated from Phillips Academy in 1963.
He attended Harvard College, originally majoring in political science, but switching to English after taking a course in creative writing from Robert Fitzgerald. He received an AB degree from Harvard in 1967.

Kidder served in the United States Army as a first lieutenant, Military Intelligence, Vietnam, from 1967 to 1969. After returning from Vietnam, he wrote for some time and was admitted to the Iowa Writers' Workshop. He received an MFA degree from the University of Iowa in 1974.

Career
Kidder wrote his first book, The Road to Yuba City: a Journey into the Juan Corona Murders, while at the University of Iowa. The Atlantic Monthly commissioned the work, and he continued writing as a freelancer for the magazine during the 1970s. The Road to Yuba City was a critical failure, and Kidder said in a 1995 interview that

I can't say anything intelligent about that book, except that I learned never to write about a murder case. The whole experience was disgusting, so disgusting, in fact, that in 1981 I went to Doubleday and bought back the rights to the book. I don't want The Road to Yuba City to see the light of day again.

Kidder has said that, unlike many other writers, he was not much influenced by his Vietnam experience: "Of course, whenever you're in an experience like Vietnam, it is bound to influence your work; it's inevitable, but I really don't think it greatly shaped me as a writer." His works for The Atlantic Monthly include several essays and short stories about the Vietnam War, including "The Death of Major Great" (1974), "Soldiers of Misfortune" (1978), and "In Quarantine" (1980). Writing in 1997, David Bennett rated these three pieces "among the finest reporting to come out of Vietnam."

Kidder's second book, The Soul of a New Machine (1981), was much more successful than his first. His account of the complex community and environment of programming and computer development won the Pulitzer Prize for General Nonfiction in 1982. He has continued to write nonfiction books and articles, and these have been well received by the critics. Kidder's 2009 book, Strength in What Remains, is a portrait of a man who survived the genocide in Burundi.

He has explored a wide range of topics through his books: House (1985), a "biography" of a couple having their first house built, and the people involved in the project; Among Schoolchildren (1989), set in an elementary-school classroom in Holyoke, Massachusetts, and reflecting on US education through the lives of these 20 children and their teacher (these two books were both bestsellers); and Old Friends (1993), which explored the daily lives and personal growth of a pair of elderly men in a nursing home. His books have made "Notable" annual lists of The New York Times and received positive praise from critics, in addition to awards.

In fall 2010 Kidder was selected as the first A. M. Rosenthal Writer-in-Residence at the Harvard Kennedy School's Shorenstein Center on Media, Politics and Public Policy. At the center, he worked with his onetime editor at The Atlantic, Richard Todd, on a book about writing, titled Good Prose: The Art of Nonfiction. He lectured to students and did research to identify his next narrative subject.

Selected awards
 Pulitzer Prize for General Nonfiction, 1982, for The Soul of a New Machine
 National Book Award for Nonfiction, 1982, for The Soul of a New Machine
 Robert F. Kennedy Book Award, 1989–1990, for Among Schoolchildren
L. L. Winship/PEN New England Award, 1990, for Among Schoolchildren
 Ambassador Book Award in American Studies, 1990, for Among Schoolchildren
 Golden Plate Award of the American Academy of Achievement, 2001 
 Lettre Ulysses Award (2nd prize), 2004, for Mountains Beyond Mountains

Books

Notes

References

External links
 Kidder's web site
 Lyceum Agency
 1985 audio interview of Tracy Kidder at Wired for Books.org by Don Swaim
 
 
 C-SPAN Q&A interview with Kidder, October 11, 2009

1945 births
20th-century American non-fiction writers
21st-century American non-fiction writers
American technology writers
The Atlantic (magazine) people
Harvard College alumni
Iowa Writers' Workshop alumni
Living people
National Book Award winners
Phillips Academy alumni
Pulitzer Prize for General Non-Fiction winners
United States Army officers
United States Army personnel of the Vietnam War
Writers from New York City